Faqerlu (also Romanized as Fāqerlū; also known as Fāghelū and Fāqehlū) is a village in Hendudur Rural District, Sarband District, Shazand County, Markazi Province, Iran. At the 2006 census, its population was 89, in 23 families.

References 

Populated places in Shazand County